The End is the second full-length studio album by heavy metal music group Forever in Terror. The album shows a more progressive sound and is the first album to feature Chad Lundgren and the only album to feature Ben Kantura and Mike Wartko. It is also the band's first album to be released without a record label.

Track listing

Personnel
Forever in Terror
Chris Bianchi - Vocals
Glenn Moore - Lead guitar
Ben Kantura - Rhythm guitar
Chad Lundgren - Bass guitar
Mike Wartko - Keyboards
Nick Borukhovsky - Drums

Guest
Joey Nelson of Beneath the Sky - Vocals on "Lunar Fortress"

References

2009 albums
Forever in Terror albums